The Human Fertilisation and Embryology (Deceased Fathers) Act 2003 (c 24) is an Act of the Parliament of the United Kingdom.

The Act amended the Human Fertilisation and Embryology Act 1990 to allow, among other things, a man to be listed in birth certificates as the father of a child even if the child was conceived after the death of the man. It is thought to affect around five to ten families a year.

Section 2
Sections 2(2) and (3) were repealed by section 30 of, and the Schedule to, the Legislative and Regulatory Reform Act 2006.

References
Halsbury's Statutes,

External links
The Human Fertilisation and Embryology (Deceased Fathers) Act 2003, as amended from the National Archives.
The Human Fertilisation and Embryology (Deceased Fathers) Act 2003, as originally enacted from the National Archives.
Explanatory notes to the Human Fertilisation and Embryology (Deceased Fathers) Act 2003.

United Kingdom Acts of Parliament 2003
Family law in the United Kingdom
Paternity in the United Kingdom